The 2011 All-Ireland Senior Camogie Championship Final will be the eightieth All-Ireland Final and the deciding match of the 2011 All-Ireland Senior Camogie Championship, an inter-county camogie tournament for the top teams in Ireland.

Wexford won by two points.

References

All
All-Ireland Senior Camogie Championship Finals
All-Ireland Senior Camogie Championship Final
All-Ireland Senior Camogie Championship Final, 2011